Established in 2009, India Home Health Care (IHHC) founded by V.Thiyagarajan provides home health care and home nursing services in Chennai, Bangalore, Hyderabad, Pune & Mumbai in India. It has 800 employees, registered nurses, associate nurses and medical caretakers across these two cities. IHHC announced expansion into Hyderabad & Pune in 2014.

In July 2013, BAYADA Home Health Care, USA acquired 26% stake in India Home Health Care and formed a partnership to ensure quality home health care in India. Bayada employs over 18,000 nursing support staff in 250 offices throughout the United States and India. Bayada and India Home Health Care have announced an investment of $10 million to create a pan India presence by 2016 with a team size of 3000 and revenue of $12 million.

Work 
IHHC's services cater to geriatric patients, patients with neurological disorders, orthopaedics and cancer patients. It also offers home health care for post surgical care, new born care and care for terminal illnesses. Bayada has also launched IHHC’s NRI services through its offices in the USA.

References

External links 

Home Health Care India

Nursing in India
Health care companies of India
Healthcare in Chennai
Healthcare in Bangalore
Companies based in Chennai
Health care companies established in 2009
Indian companies established in 2009
2009 establishments in Tamil Nadu